International Fleet Review may refer to:

 International Fleet Review 2005
 International Fleet Review 2013
 International Fleet Review 2016